Alessandro Tassoni (28 September 156525 April 1635) was an Italian poet and writer, from Modena, best known as the author of the mock-heroic poem La secchia rapita (The Rape of the Pail, or The stolen bucket).

Life 
He was born in Modena, to a noble family, from  Bernardino Tassoni and Sigismonda Pellicciari. Having lost both parents at an early age, he was raised by the maternal grandfather, Giovanni Pellicciari. It was with Giovanni that, according to tradition, he first visited the bucket, which was later to inspire his major work, in the belfry of Modena's Cathedral.

At the age of 13, Alessandro Tassoni was taught Greek and Latin by Lazzaro Labadini, a professor of Literature at the University.

He then became a law student, attending university in Modena, then in Bologna, Pisa and Ferrara, where he eventually graduated. He appears to have been a rowdy youth, living for some time in Nonantola, from where he was expelled in 1595, due to several incidents in which Tassoni had been involved as a member of a local street gang.

In 1597, he began his service for the cardinal Ascanio Colonna whom he followed to Spain. 
In 1589 he was elected to the Accademia della Crusca. In 1603, he was back in Italy and moved to Rome.

In 1612 he published anonymously the booklet Le Filippiche in which he attacked the Spanish domination of parts of the Italian peninsula. Though he always denied having written it (probably for fear of Spanish retaliation), the work became famous enough to ingratiate Tassoni to the Charles Emmanuel I, Duke of Savoy, who, in 1618 hired him in Turin with the title of first secretary.

After this, Tassoni was with the cardinal Ludovico Ludovisi in 1626 and served under Francesco I d'Este, duke of Modena, in 1635.

He died in Modena. His fellow citizens remembered his life and work with a statue that can still be seen in front of the town symbol, the Ghirlandina.

Work 

Besides the above-mentioned "Filippiche", Tassoni is known for other works, some of poetry and some of literary criticism. However, Tassoni is best known as the author of the mock-heroic poem La secchia rapita (The Rape of the Pail, or The stolen bucket); it is by virtue of this work that he is remembered as Modena's poet laureate.

La secchia rapita 

La secchia rapita was written by Tassoni between 1614 and 1615 and first published in Paris in 1622. It was not to be published in Italy until Tassoni modified it slightly to accommodate the censorship of the Catholic Church. Tassoni paid for the first Italian edition, bearing his own name, in 1624 (the poem had been previously circulated under the pseudonym of Aldrovinci Melisone). The final edition was published in 1630.

The poem is loosely based on a war originating from the battle of Zappolino fought between  Modena and Bologna in 1325.  Most of the events reported in the poem are completely fictitious, even incorporating in the war the battle of Fossalta which had been fought almost a hundred years before. The central episode, in which the Modenese steal a bucket from their rivals, is not reported by the main contemporary historians, however a bucket, purported to be that very trophy, has been on display, in the basement of the Torre della Ghirlandina, from the times of the battle to present.

In the poem, the theft of the bucket results in the eruption of an extremely complicated war, where even the Olympian gods take part (this is in the tradition of classical poems such as Homer's Iliad) and is eventually resolved by the intervention of the Pope.

The narration is dotted by references to situations and persons contemporary to the author, and with farcical appearances such as the "Conte di Culagna" (Count of Ass-land) probably the best known character of the book. In the third chapter of the poem, armies from all over the country arrive to take part in the war, and the Conte of Culagna makes his first appearance:

(*)The feathers recall the peacock and its vanity, the horns are the traditional symbol of the cuckold.

References

External links
 
 

Italian poets
Italian male poets
1565 births
1635 deaths
Writers from Modena
Baroque writers